St Mary's GAA was a Gaelic Athletic Association club located in the Shandon area of Cork, Ireland. The club took its name from the nearby Cathedral of St Mary and St Anne. The club was predominantly involved with the game of hurling and fielded teams from the 1880s until the 1920s.

Notable players
 Fan Barry
 Paddy Healy
 Dan Kennefick
 Tim Nagle
 Paddy O'Halloran

References

Gaelic games clubs in County Cork
Hurling clubs in County Cork